Pieman River Power Development was a major 1970s and 1980s hydroelectric development of the Pieman River and its tributaries on the west coast of Tasmania.

Development
The Pieman River Power Development was approved by the Tasmanian government in 1971, construction began in 1974 and it was completed in 1987.

The damming of the river was the subject of a struggle between conservation groups and Hydro Tasmania, similar to Lake Pedder . The struggle went relatively unnoticed on mainland Australia - and it was the proposed Franklin Dam issue that was to catch a much wider Australian audience, than the damming of the Pieman or King Rivers.

The development included three power stations and five dams:- 
 Lake Murchison and Murchison Dam  
 Lake Mackintosh, Tullabardine Dam and Mackintosh Dam (Mackintosh Power Station), commissioned in 1982
 Lake Rosebery and Bastyan Dam (Bastyan Power Station), commissioned in 1983
 Lake Pieman and Reece Dam (Reece Power Station), commissioned in 1986/1987

It also included work on the two major tributaries of the Pieman, the Mackintosh and the Murchison rivers.

Legacy
It remains Hydro Tasmania's most successfully multi-dammed catchment on the West Coast, and it was developed  after the Upper Gordon Scheme (Lake Pedder) and was being completed in the era of the Franklin Dam controversy.  It could be seen as the last major Power Development Scheme undertaken by the Hydro during its stage as an expanding dam-making enterprise.  The King River and Henty River developments that followed required specifically challenging engineering on the part of Hydro, but were smaller projects in duration.

See also

Hydro Tasmania

References

External links

 
Western Tasmania
Hydro-Tasmania power development schemes